Athletics may refer to:

Sports
 Sport of athletics, a collection of sporting events that involve competitive running, jumping, throwing, and walking
 Track and field, a sub-category of the above sport
 Athletics (physical culture), competitions based on human qualities of stamina, fitness, and skill
 College athletics, non-professional, collegiate- and university-level competitive physical sports and games

Teams
 Oakland Athletics, an American professional baseball team
 Philadelphia Athletics (1860–76), an American professional baseball team
 Philadelphia Athletics (American Association), an American professional baseball team, 1882–1890
 Philadelphia Athletics (1890–91), an American baseball team
 Philadelphia Athletics (NFL), a professional American football team, 1902–1903

Other uses
 Athletics (band), an American post-rock band

See also 
 Athlete (disambiguation)
 Athletic (disambiguation)
 athleticism